Pillsbury is an unincorporated community in Todd County, Minnesota, United States.

Notes

Unincorporated communities in Todd County, Minnesota
Unincorporated communities in Minnesota